Abbeywood Records is a Canadian independent record label founded in 1999 in Toronto. The label is home to Zambian born Canadian composer Hennie Bekker and the World fusion group AO Music.

External links
 Abbeywood Records official website

Record labels established in 1999
Canadian independent record labels
Companies based in Toronto
1999 establishments in Ontario